Alexis Nihon Complex (French: Complexe Alexis Nihon) is a  building complex in Downtown Montreal, Quebec, Canada (on the border with Westmount), consisting of a shopping centre, two office towers, and a residential building. It is named after the inventor and businessman Alexis Nihon. The shopping mall is directly connected to the Atwater metro station, which joins the building by a short tunnel with the adjacent Dawson College, and by a longer one adjoins nearby Westmount Square. The original complex was designed by the Montreal architect Harold Ship, and its architectural plans are housed at the Canadian Centre for Architecture.

On October 26, 1986, a major fire heavily damaged its 16-story office building and is still considered the city's biggest fire in a skyscraper. At least six stories were destroyed in the blaze. In 2002, the service de sécurité incendie de Montréal was heavily blamed for negligence and incompetence according to the Cour d'Appel du Québec. Several tenants including the federal government sued the then-owner of the building for several million dollars.

During the Dawson shooting incident on September 13, 2006, the building was fully evacuated and some workers thought there were gunshots fired in the complex. Shots did reach the building during the shooting.

On April 5, 2017, a minor fire broke out near the roof of the food court. Minor damage occurred as a result.

The shopping mall portion is anchored by Canadian Tire, IGA, Sports Experts, Winners and Pharmaprix.

The block now containing the mall was once the site of Atwater Park, home of the Montreal Royals baseball team through 1927.

Directions 

Alexis Nihon, at the corner of Atwater Avenue and Ste-Catherine Street West, is accessible:

 By Metro: Green line, Atwater Station. This station directly connects to Alexis Nihon Plaza.
 By Bus: Bus lines 24, 63, 90, 104, 138, 144, 356 and 360.
 By Car: A-720/Ville-Marie Expressway, Exit 2 - Atwater Avenue.
 By Bicycle: Bicycle stations levels P1 and P3 of the parking.
 By BIXI: BIXI Station De Maisonneuve Boulevard West at the corner of Atwater.
 By Taxi: Waiting area Atwater Avenue at the corner of de Maisonneuve Boulevard West.

Stores 

The complex is directly connected to the Atwater Metro station and offers numerous services, a variety of shops and superstores, and a food court with over 25 restaurants. From 1982 until 1986, it housed Montreal's only downtown IKEA Store, which due to a lack of space, moved out to its own building at to boul. Cavendish in Saint-Laurent. Alexis Nihon also previously housed Miracle Mart (later becoming an M-Store, a three-screen cinema operated by Cineplex Odeon, Zellers and Steinberg's supermarket. When the complex first opened in 1967 the French department store Au Printemps opened it first location outside France.

See also
 Alexis Nihon
 Centre Laval
 List of shopping malls in Montreal

References

External links
Official website
 Location of Place Alexis Nihon

Burned buildings and structures in Canada
Downtown Montreal
Rebuilt buildings and structures in Canada
Shopping malls established in 1967
Shopping malls in Montreal
Skyscrapers in Montreal
Skyscraper office buildings in Canada
Residential skyscrapers in Canada
1967 establishments in Quebec